Cacozelia is a genus of snout moths. It was described by Augustus Radcliffe Grote in 1878 and is known from Venezuela.

Species
 Cacozelia basiochrealis Grote, 1878
 Cacozelia elegans (Schaus, 1912)
 Cacozelia interruptella  
 Cacozelia neotropica (Amsel, 1956)
 Cacozelia pemphusalis  (=Cacozelia alboplagialis Dyar, 1905)

References

Epipaschiinae
Pyralidae genera